Eleanor Beatrice Marcy "Beazy" Sweeney (–) was an American plant physiologist and a pioneering investigator into circadian rhythms. At the time of her death she was professor emerita at the University of California, Santa Barbara, where she had worked since 1961.

Having started her career as a botanist, serendipity led her to dinoflagellate research. She investigated circadian rhythms in photoluminescent dinoflagellates, and other single celled organisms. Later in her career she served as a senior officer in many scientific organizations, including the American Association for the Advancement of Science and the American Institute of Biological Sciences.

Early life and education

She attended graduate school at Radcliffe College, where she investigated how auxin affected cytoplasmic streaming in Avena seedlings under the supervision of Kenneth V. Thimann. She was helped in her research by Folke K. Skoog, who was a postdoctoral fellow at Harvard at the time. She completed her Ph.D. degree in 1942.  She married her first husband in 1932 and had four children. In 1961 married secondly the physicist Paul Hartmann Lee.

Career
Following the completion of her Ph.D., she followed her first husband to Rochester, MD. She was initially unable to find an academic job in botany, so she worked as a lab technician. She then worked as a postdoctoral fellow at the Mayo Clinic. She again followed her husband to San Diego, and she found employment at the Scripps Institution of Oceanography, where she first began working with dinoflagellates, and began her investigations in circadian rhythms. In 1961 she moved to Yale, where she was appointed a lecturer in algal physiology. However, at Yale she was never given a permanent position, so in 1967, she returned to the west coast, with an appointment at the University of California, Santa Barbara, where she was made professor in 1971, and professor emerita in 1982. She served as the associate provost of College of Creative Studies from 1978 to 1981.

While in Santa Barbara, Sweeney gave a tour of the campus to the daughter of a family friend, future Nobel laureate Carol W. Greider, who was a high school student at the time. This led to Greider studying at the College of Creative Studies. Sweeney introduced Greider to research during her freshman year, and mentored her throughout the rest of her time at UCSB.

Sweeney was president of the American Society for Photobiology in 1979, the American Institute of Biological Sciences in 1980, the pacific division of the American Association for the Advancement of Science in 1981, and the Phycological Society of America in 1986.

In 1983, the Botanical Society of America awarded her the Darbaker Prize for Study of Microscopic Algae, with the citation as follows:

Dr. Sweeney is a world-respected innovator in the study of circadian rhythms, particularly in the dinoflagellates. By bringing dinoflagellates into culture and by defining their multiple photoperiodic responses, especially the physiological and ultrastructural aspects of the circadian rhythms of their bioluminescence, she has influenced the research direction of many laboratories.

She received honorary doctorates from Umeå University in 1985, and Knox College in 1986.

She suffered a stroke on 30 June 1989 while traveling to the Gordon Conference on Chronobiology, while visiting the Marine Biological Laboratory at the invitation of her long time collaborator John Woodland Hastings, and fell into a coma. She died on 17 July 1989.

Research
Upon arrival at the Scripps Institution, Sweeney wanted to study photosynthesis of red and brown algae in different colors of light. However, she encountered delays in procuring the equipment, so on the suggestion of her colleague Marston Sargent, she attempted to culture dinoflagellates. An early success was the discovery that Akashiwo sanguinea (then known as Gymnodinium splendens) requires vitamin B12 in order to grow.

She was also able to culture Lingulodinium polyedra (then known as Gonyaulax polyedra), and became interested in its bioluminescence. She noticed that it luminesced in daily cycles, and presented this result at a conference. At that time, biological rhythms were known for a variety of assemblages of cells but Sweeney noted that when such rhythms shifted, it was impossible to tell if all cells shifted or if the population became unsynchronized.  To address this question, she studied single cells in Cartesian divers and found that rhythms occurred in single cells that responded similarly to resetting stimuli.  John Woodland Hastings (known as Woody Hastings) heard Sweeney present her work on rhythms at a conference in Asilomar in 1955 and became acquainted with her because he shared her interest in bioluminescent dinoflagellates. They began a collaboration, with Woodland joining her at the Scripps Institution during the summers of 1955 to 1957. Together with Woodland's student Marlene Karakashian, they characterized the circadian rhythm of the species. Later, at Yale, she used electron microscopy to image the internal structure of G. polyedra.

In 1960, she joined an expedition from Cairns to Thursday Island aboard a crocodile hunting boat. She was able to collect a sample of Acetabularia, a green algae with the ability to survive for long periods without its nucleus, enabling her to determine that a nucleus was not required for the maintenance of a circadian rhythm. In 1969 and 1975, she went to sea aboard the NSF's RV Alpha Helix, and studied bioluminescence on voyages to New Guinea and South East Asia. She studied the red tides that killed fish, caused by dinoflagellate algae, and consulted with groups trying to combat these disasters.

She continued her research into circadian rhythms for the rest of her career, publishing her monograph Rhythmic Phenomena in Plants in 1969, and a second edition in 1987.

Publications
Over her career, Sweeney was the author of 139 manuscripts.

Selected publications

References

American women biologists
Radcliffe College alumni
University of California, Santa Barbara faculty
1914 births
1989 deaths
American microbiologists
20th-century American women
20th-century American people